Chulumani is a municipality in Bolivia. It is the capital of the Sud Yungas region. Agriculture dominates the area, which produces bananas, coffee, and coca leaves. Chulumani is subtropical with warm temperatures and high humidity.

Although the city is not as popular for tourists as Coroico, Chulumani is also part of the Yungas Road. One landmark on the road to Chulumani is the 'Castillo de los Patos' which is situated beside the Chaco waterfall. A few kilometers away from Chulumani is the Apa-Apa Ecological Reserve .

Many travel sites have advice for touring the area. Lonely Planet adds, "The only time Chulumani breaks its pervasive tranquility is during the week following August 24, when it stages the riotous Fiesta de San Bartolomé."

References 

Populated places in La Paz Department (Bolivia)